Cheiracanthium angulitarse is a spider species found in Europe.

References 

angulitarse
Spiders described in 1878
Spiders of Europe